Brett David Whiteley (born 1 July 1960, Burnie, Tasmania) is an Australian politician. Whiteley was a Member of the House of Representatives representing the federal division of Braddon. He was elected at the 2013 federal election for the Liberal Party, defeating Labor's Sid Sidebottom, but was defeated after one term by Labor's Justine Keay at the 2016 federal election.

Prior to his election to federal parliament, Whiteley was a multi- Member of the Tasmanian House of Assembly representing the state electorate of Braddon from the 2002 state election until his defeat at the 2010 state election. In his first speech to state parliament, Whiteley stated that in 1993 he opened, in conjunction with two other people, a Christian training and retreat centre in Sheffield. He worked in this role for seven years. He served as an alderman for the City of Burnie from 1999 to 2002.

In November 2012, Whiteley was endorsed as the Liberal candidate for the federal seat of Braddon. He won the seat against Labor's Sid Sidebottom with a swing of 10.0 points.

Whiteley did not live in his electorate during the 2016 election campaign, but in neighbouring Lyons, at Squeaking Point near Port Sorell.

On 27 September 2015, Prime Minister Turnbull announced that Whiteley would replace Andrew Nikolic as a Government Whip in the House of Representatives. Whiteley lost his seat at the 2016 federal election to Labor candidate Justine Keay.  He was the unsuccessful Liberal candidate in the 2018 Braddon by-election.

References

External links 

 

1960 births
Liberal Party of Australia members of the Parliament of Tasmania
Liberal Party of Australia members of the Parliament of Australia
Living people
Members of the Australian House of Representatives
Members of the Australian House of Representatives for Braddon
Members of the Tasmanian House of Assembly
Turnbull Government
21st-century Australian politicians